The Flying Pickets is a British a cappella vocal group which had a Christmas number one hit in 1983 on the UK Singles Chart with their cover version of Yazoo's track "Only You".

History
The band of six was founded by Brian Hibbard in 1982 from a group of actors who had been active with him in John McGrath's 7:84 theatre group, a fringe theatre organisation who had sung a cappella in their production of the 1981 play One Big Blow. The group chose the name the Flying Pickets as band members had played a part in the UK miners' strikes of 1972 and 1974.

Performing in clubs and pubs in London, the Flying Pickets came up with a concept of transferring the art of a cappella to the pop music scene. Joining Hibbard in the group were Rick Lloyd (who also wrote the music to One Big Blow), Gareth Williams, David Brett, Ken Gregson (real name Kenneth Gregory) and Red Stripe (real name David Gittins). The members of the group were internationally renowned for their flamboyant appearance: Hibbard's huge sideburns, Stripe's thick eye-liner, and the others showing off gaudy suits and large hats. Two of the other original members, Ron Donachie and Christopher Ryan left the band before "Only You".

"Only You", their first single, was the UK Christmas number one in 1983 spending a total of five weeks at the top, and also doing well around Europe and in Canada, where it reached number 17 in spring 1984. It emulated the success of the original Yazoo version. The video was shot in the Red Lion And Pineapple, Acton High Street, London.

The name "Flying Pickets" refers to mobile strikers who travel in order to join a picket, reflecting the group's radical socialist political views. The height of the group's fame coincided with the 1984 miners strike, when the National Union of Mineworkers called strike action following the National Coal Board's decision to close 20 pits – a move which would claim some 20,000 jobs. The Flying Pickets were vocal in their support of the miners during the dispute and came to blows with the record label Virgin after they picketed Drax Power Station in Yorkshire. They also performed benefit gigs for the miners. Hibbard himself claimed that their political beliefs probably had a detrimental effect on the group's mainstream image but it was a sacrifice they were willing to make; according to the group, one well-known record store refused to sell the group's albums due to their support of strike action.

Despite the group's socialist views, the Conservative Prime Minister Margaret Thatcher proclaimed, to much amusement and skepticism, that "Only You" was her favourite record. A second single, a cover version of Van McCoy's "(When You're) Young and in Love" (originally written for Ruby and the Romantics) reached number 7 in the UK, but their third, a cover of the Eurythmics' "Who's That Girl" barely charted.

In 1986, Hibbard and Stripe left the band and were replaced by Gary Howard and Hereward Kaye. Hibbard and Stripe tried to stay in the music industry, forming their own act called Brian and Stripe, but their first and only single, a cover version of Yazoo's "Mr. Blue", failed to chart, and they returned to their separate acting careers.

In 1987, the Flying Pickets sang the title song (in Latin, Dives in Omnia) and endtitles reprise to Porterhouse Blue, in the style of a medieval university drinking-song.

The group sang two songs on the Eric Woolfson/Alan Parsons 1990 album Freudiana.

The Flying Pickets' line-up has changed throughout the years, but the band never died; since the Pickets began, there have been around 27 members. The last member of the original line-up, David Brett, left the band in 1990. However, in 1994, the original line-up (minus Lloyd) reformed to record one more album.

Although none of the founding members have been part of the group since 1990, the Flying Pickets continue to record albums and tour all over Europe and abroad.

Post-Picket activities
Hibbard, the group's founder and lead singer, went on to act in Doctor Who and then briefly in Coronation Street as Doug Murray. He appeared regularly on Welsh television. He also had a brief role as Bobby-John Downes in the soap opera Emmerdale in 2003 and then came back for another brief spell in 2006. He appeared in the cult 1997 film Twin Town, playing the part of the karaoke king, Dai Rhys. In 2006, Hibbard won the BAFTA Cymru Award for Best Actor for his role as Tony in the film Little White Lies. He also appeared in Doctors in 2005. He died on 17 June 2012.

Brett toured with the English Shakespeare Company and appeared as Mad Mike the Mechanic in the BBC children's TV programme Marlene Marlowe Investigates. In 2000, Brett played the part of Dedalus Diggle in the film Harry Potter and the Philosopher's Stone.

Williams toured in a production of South Pacific and also with The English Shakespeare Company; he played Nathan Detroit in a production of Guys & Dolls. He also worked with Jonathan Miller on a TV adaptation of Henry Mayhew's London Labour, London Poor. In 2009, he understudied and went on for Patrick Stewart in the Theatre Royal Haymarket production of Waiting for Godot.

Gittins worked in bread delivery after leaving the band, then decided to move to Australia where he took a job as a stage mechanist at The Victorian State Theatre. He also co-developed the techno act Poets of the Machine.

Gregson also emigrated to Australia and has made an appearance in the soap Neighbours.

Lloyd was a joint winner of a BAFTA TV Award for his work on the 1987 TV series Porterhouse Blue, and was musical director for the 1999 film Julie and the Cadillacs.

Members

Original
Brian Hibbard
Ken Gregson
David Brett
Red Stripe
Rick Lloyd
Gareth Williams

Present
Andy Laycock
Simon John Foster
Michael Henry 
Christopher Brooker
Martin George

Other past members
Henrik Wager
Andrea Figallo
James Gibb
Damion Scarcella
Dylan Foster
Hereward Kaye
Gary Howard
Nick Godfrey
Lex Lewis
Ricky Payne
Paul Kissaun
Fraser Collins
Gavin Muir

Discography

References

External links

 Official website of the Flying Pickets
 Andrea Figallo's website
 Michael Henry's website
 Paul Kissaun's website
 Hereward Kaye's website
 

 
A cappella musical groups
English vocal groups
Musical groups established in 1982
Socialism in the United Kingdom
Musical groups from London
Virgin Records artists